A list of American films released in 1921. In the years before, during and since World War I several major studios based in Hollywood had come to dominate American film production including Paramount, Fox, Universal, Vitagraph, Goldwyn, First National and United Artists. American-made films enjoyed great commercial success around the world and relied on an established star system.

A–B

C–D

E–F

G–H

I–J

K–L

M–N

O–Q

R–S

T

U–V

W–Z

Serials

Shorts

See also 
 1921 in the United States

References

External links 

 1921 films at the Internet Movie Database

1921
Films
Lists of 1921 films by country or language
1920s in American cinema